Strabomantis necopinus is a species of frog in the family Strabomantidae. It is endemic to the Cordillera Central in Colombia, where it is known from Antioquia, Caldas, Risaralda, Quindío, and Tolima Departments at elevations of  asl.

The natural habitat of Strabomantis necopinus is primary cloud forest with abundant fallen leaves on the ground. It is a terrestrial and diurnal species. It is threatened by habitat loss caused by logging and agricultural development.

References

External links
 

necopinus
Amphibians of Colombia
Endemic fauna of Colombia
Taxonomy articles created by Polbot
Amphibians described in 1997